The Tax Court of Canada (TCC), established in 1983 by the Tax Court of Canada Act, is a federal superior court which deals with matters involving companies or individuals and tax issues with the Government of Canada.

Jurisdiction 
Appeals of decisions of the Tax Court of Canada are exclusively within the jurisdiction of the Federal Court of Appeal. On occasion, the Supreme Court of Canada grants leave to appeal a federal tax case from a decision of the Federal Court of Appeal where the question involved is considered to be of public importance.

Procedure 

The litigation of a federal tax dispute is commenced by a taxpayer filing a Notice of Appeal in the Tax Court of Canada. Cases may proceed either by way of Informal or General Procedure. The Informal Procedure is a simplified process available to taxpayers where the total tax and penalties (but not interest) at issue is CAD$25,000 or less per taxation year ($50,000 in the case of GST).

In General Procedure cases, discoveries are held by exchange of documents followed by the examination, without a judge, of one witness on behalf of each party. One or both parties may then apply for a hearing date where witnesses will be examined and cross-examined before a judge and documents formally entered into evidence. Trials in the Tax Court of Canada typically take one day or less, particularly where the parties have agreed on all or substantially all of the facts, but in more complex and contentious cases the trial may not be completed for several weeks or even months.

In the Tax Court of Canada, the onus is generally on the taxpayer to prove its case on a balance of probabilities,  except in respect of civil penalties where the Canada Revenue Agency carries the burden of proof. Generally, the Minister of National Revenue is represented by specialized tax litigation counsel from the Department of Justice.

The decision whether, and on what basis, to settle any particular case is made on a collaborative basis between the Canada Revenue Agency and the Department of Justice. Settlements are generally based on a principled approach to the matter rather than strictly as a percentage of the dollar amount at stake. This differs from the rules of general civil litigation, but it does offer the opportunity to develop creative settlement strategies particularly where multiple taxation years or issues are involved.

In granting judgment in favour of a taxpayer, the Tax Court of Canada may order the Minister of National Revenue to reassess on the basis described by the judge in the reasons for judgment or, where the assessment or reassessment is wholly incorrect, the assessment or reassessment may be vacated entirely.

Costs are recoverable by the successful party in accordance with rather modest tariff amounts, but reasonable disbursements incurred by the successful party (including expert witness costs) are generally fully recoverable.

Judges
The salary of judges is determined annually by the Judicial Compensation and Benefits Commission. Chief Justice and Associate Chief Justice receive $315,900 while the other judges receive $288,100 annually.

Chief Judge
 The Honourable Eugene Rossiter

Associate Chief Judge
 The Honourable Lucie Lamarre

Judges (in order of seniority)

 The Honourable Pierre Archambault (supernumerary)
 The Honourable Alain Tardif (supernumerary)
 The Honourable Diane Campbell (supernumerary)
 The Honourable Campbell J. Miller (supernumerary)
 The Honourable Brent Paris
 The Honourable Judith Woods
 The Honourable Réal Favreau
 The Honourable Gaston Jorré
 The Honourable Patrick J. Boyle
 The Honourable Valerie Miller
 The Honourable Robert J. Hogan
 The Honourable Steven K. D'Arcy
 The Honourable Frank J. Pizzitelli
 The Honourable Johanne D'Auray
 The Honourable David Graham
 The Honourable Kathleen T. Lyons
 The Honourable John R. Owen
 The Honourable Dominique Lafleur
 The Honourable Sylvain Ouimet
 The Honourable Don R. Sommerfeldt
 The Honourable Henry A. Visser
 The Honourable Guy R. Smith
 The Honourable Bruce Russell

Deputy Judges (alphabetical order)

 The Honourable D.W. Rowe
 The Honourable N. Weisman

Former judges

 Eric A. Bowie, Judge (1995-2019)
 Alban Garon, Chief Justice (1988-2004)
 Louise Lamarre Proulx, Judge (retired 2008)

References

External links
 Tax Court of Canada Website Portal

1983 establishments in Canada
Courts in Canada
Taxation in Canada
Tax courts
Courts and tribunals established in 1983